The Early Treatment for HIV Act (or ETHA) ( and ) is a bill introduced in the U.S. Senate.

The stated purpose of the bill is "to amend title XIX of the Social Security Act to permit States the option to provide Medicaid coverage for low-income individuals infected with HIV."


Problems with Medicaid Coverage Before ETHA 

Before the Early Treatment for HIV act, adults with asymptomatic HIV were ineligible to receive SSI income until they had developed AIDS. This is due to a person being unable to receive SSI payments unless they are classified as disabled. Many individuals were not able to receive medical care for their HIV because they did not quality for Medicaid, and their symptoms continued to progress without treatment.

ETHA would help adults with asymptomatic HIV receive treatment, which will slow the development of AIDS and lessen the severity of their symptoms. It would also result in a lower viral count for those treated, which means AIDS will be less likely to spread from that person to someone else.

Previous Versions of the Bill 

In the 110th Congress, ETHA ( was introduced in the U.S. Senate on March 13, 2007.  The bill was sponsored by Senators Gordon Smith (R-OR) with 38 cosponsors including  Hillary Clinton (D-NY) and Bernie Sanders (I-VT).

Previous versions of the bill were introduced in the Republican-controlled 106th, 107th, 108th, and 109th Congresses.  In each case, the bill never made it out of committee.

References 

 Full text of bill 
 Human Rights Campaign's fact sheet on the bill

United States proposed federal health legislation
2009 in LGBT history
History of HIV/AIDS
Proposed legislation of the 107th United States Congress
Proposed legislation of the 108th United States Congress
Proposed legislation of the 109th United States Congress
Proposed legislation of the 110th United States Congress
Proposed legislation of the 111th United States Congress
Proposed legislation of the 112th United States Congress